In a career that spanned more than forty years, Judy Garland performed on stage, screen and television. Garland appeared in 34 feature films. She was nominated for multiple Academy Awards and Golden Globe Awards, receiving an Academy Juvenile Award and one Golden Globe. Her film career was interrupted in 1951 after she was cast in a series of films she was unable to complete, but she returned to the screen in 1954 in A Star Is Born and continued to appear in films until 1963.

Although Garland appeared in concert as early as 1943, it was only when her film career stalled that she began regular concert appearances, beginning with a critically acclaimed 1951 concert series at the London Palladium. Garland set a record when she appeared for 19 weeks at the Palace Theatre in New York City, also in 1951, and her 1961 concert Judy at Carnegie Hall is often considered one of the greatest nights in show business history. She continued to tour until just three months prior to her death in 1969.

Garland starred in a series of television specials beginning in 1955, when she appeared in the first episode of Ford Star Jubilee. The success of these specials led CBS to offer Garland a regular series. The Judy Garland Show premiered in 1963. Although the show was critically well-received, it suffered in the Nielsen ratings from being scheduled across from Bonanza, which was then the most popular show on the air. The Judy Garland Show was canceled after one season but Garland and the series were nominated for Emmy Awards.

Filmography

Feature films

Short subjects

Unfinished films

Box office ranking

At the height of her career, Garland was regularly ranked among the top movie stars in the US in the annual poll conducted by Quigley publishing:
 1940 – 10th
 1941 – 10th
 1942 – 19th
 1943 – 11th
 1944 – 14th
 1945 – 9th
 1946 – 25th
 1950 – 25th

Concerts
Garland appeared in concert over 1,100 times. Listed below are some of her key concert performances.

Television
Key Garland television appearances include:

Radio appearances
For a list of songs performed on the radio, see: Radio recordings (1935–1961)

See also
 List of Judy Garland awards and honors
 List of Judy Garland biographies
 Judy Garland discography

Notes

References
 Clarke, Gerald (2000). Get Happy: The Life of Judy Garland. New York, Random House. .
 DiOrio, Jr., Al (1973). Little Girl Lost: The Life and Hard Times of Judy Garland. Manor Books.
 Edwards, Anne (1975). Judy Garland. Simon and Schuster.  (paperback edition).
 Finch, Christopher (1975). Rainbow: The Stormy Life of Judy Garland. Ballantine Books.  (paperback edition).
 Frank, Gerold (1975). Judy. Harper & Row. .
 Sanders, Coyne Steven (1990). Rainbow's End: The Judy Garland Show. Zebra Books.  (paperback edition).
 Seaman, Barbara (1996). Lovely Me: The Life of Jacqueline Susann. New York, Seven Stories Press.  (1996 edition).
 Shipman, David (1975). Judy Garland, The Secret Life of an American Legend. Harper & Row.  (paperback edition).
 St. Johns, Adela Rogers (1974). Some Are Born Great''. Doubleday & Company.

External links

Performances
Actress filmographies
American filmographies